The 2012–13 Minnesota Wild season was the 13th season for the National Hockey League (NHL) franchise that was established on June 25, 1997. The regular season was reduced from its usual 82 games to 48 due to the 2012–13 NHL lockout.

The Wild made the Stanley Cup playoffs for the first time since the 2007–08 season, where they fell to the Chicago Blackhawks in the first round.

Off-season
The Wild made a splash in the free-agent pool by signing top free agents Zach Parise and Ryan Suter on July 4, 2012. Both were signed to 13-year-long contracts.

Regular season
On February 26, 2013, Zach Parise scored just 27 seconds into the overtime period to give the Wild a 2–1 home win over the Calgary Flames. Parise tied Marian Gaborik's mark, set on January 23, 2013, when he scored 27 seconds into the overtime period to give the Rangers a 4–3 home win over the Boston Bruins. Both goals would prove to be the fastest overtime goals scored during the lockout-shortened season.

The Wild were the most disciplined team during the regular season, with a league-low 135 power-play opportunities against. They also tied the New York Islanders for the fewest shorthanded goals allowed, with zero.

Standings

Schedule and results

Playoffs

Player statistics
Finals stats 
Skaters

Goaltenders

Goaltenders

†Denotes player spent time with another team before joining the Wild.  Stats reflect time with the Wild only.
‡Traded mid-season
Bold/italics denotes franchise record

Awards and records

Awards

Transactions 
The Wild have been involved in the following transactions during the 2012–13 season.

Trades

Free agents signed

Free agents lost

Claimed via waivers

Lost via waivers

Player signings

Draft picks 
Minnesota's picks at the 2012 NHL Entry Draft in Pittsburgh, Pennsylvania. 

Draft notes
 The New Jersey Devils' second-round pick (from Washington Capitals) went to the Minnesota Wild as a result of a February 24, 2012, trade that sent Marek Zidlicky to the Devils in exchange for Kurtis Foster, Nick Palmieri, Stephane Veilleux and this pick.
 The Wild's second-round pick went to the San Jose Sharks as the result of a June 24, 2011, trade that sent Devin Setoguchi, Charlie Coyle and a 2011 first-round pick to the Wild in exchange for Brent Burns and this pick.

See also 
 2012–13 NHL season

References

Minnesota Wild seasons
M
M